Richard Fulcher (born November 18, 1968) is an American comedian, actor and author. He played Bob Fossil and other characters in the British comedy series The Mighty Boosh, and Edward Sheath in the American series Jon Benjamin Has a Van. He has also appeared in Noel Fielding's more recent show, Noel Fielding's Luxury Comedy. His other appearances include Unnatural Acts with Julian Barratt and Fielding of The Mighty Boosh and he starred in and wrote the TV series Snuff Box alongside Matt Berry.

Early life
Fulcher was born in Massachusetts. He attended St. Albans School in Washington, D.C., and then earned a degree in government from Dartmouth College. After graduating he pursued a career in comedy. He took to improvised comedy at the ImprovOlympic in Chicago, where he was one of the early members of the Upright Citizens Brigade.

Beginning in late 1992 in Chicago, Fulcher began working on a new long-form improvisational comedy concept – a completely improvised university lecture that would become known as Modern Problems In Science. After several months of rehearsing, Fulcher, Dick Costolo, and Phil Granchi launched the show at Chicago's Annoyance Theater under the direction of Tom Keevers. The show played at the Annoyance for more than a year, after which the group took the show to the 1994 Edinburgh Festival Fringe. The show became an underground hit and later toured at comedy festivals in Australia, New Zealand, Ireland, Canada and Singapore, with a run at the Bloomsbury Theatre in London. Fulcher and the group performed the show at the 1995 and 1996 Edinburgh Fringe, after which the show was made into a six-part television series for the Paramount Channel UK.

The Mighty Boosh
Fulcher played Bob Fossil in The Mighty Boosh stage, radio and television shows, as well as many other characters, including the Ape of Death and Lester Corncrake. He is also the only writer to provide additional material for the TV series apart from Noel Fielding and Julian Barratt. Fulcher has a variety of running gags on The Mighty Boosh: he plays very short characters, performing them on his knees, and as various cockney characters can be heard muttering, "I'm a cockney, I'm a cockney...". His Boosh characters will be abused and sometimes die horribly, with Fulcher saying, "A little to the left!" It was also in The Mighty Boosh that he met Matt Berry, who played Dixon Bainbridge. In the documentary A Journey Through Time and Space he was said to be the only person who plays a "watered down version of himself". Fulcher said that after portraying 'Tommy Nookah' people came up to him in the street and demanded that he 'do Tommy'.

Snuff Box
Fulcher was a star and major writer for the BBC Three sketch show Snuff Box, along with Matt Berry, whom he met on the set of The Mighty Boosh. Berry plays the High Executioner to the King of England and Fulcher his assistant. He also plays other minor characters in the series. Snuff Box was aired only once on BBC Three (Feb – April 2006) and was released on DVD in the UK in June 2008.

Tiny Acts of Rebellion
In 2009, Fulcher wrote the book Tiny Acts of Rebellion published by Michael O'Mara Books Ltd in the UK (and in the US in 2010) and illustrated by Mr Bingo. He has made several publicity appearances in the promotion of the book at book signings in Europe and the US, as well as on Episode 51 of the radio show and podcast Comedy Death-Ray Radio. Tiny Acts was also adapted into a stage show which sold out at the Edinburgh Fringe and its Soho Theatre run. It co-starred Arnab Chanda and was directed by Harry Deansway.

Career
In the US, Fulcher was one of the "undercover" comedians who posed as various absurd talk show guests in the 2004 Comedy Central series Crossballs. He was also the London body double for the character Garth in Wayne's World 2. In 1998, he starred in and wrote for the sketch show Unnatural Acts for the Paramount Comedy Channel alongside his future Mighty Boosh co-stars Julian Barratt and Noel Fielding and also Seán Cullen and Rich Easter. Fulcher played a baker in AD/BC: A Rock Opera, where he collaborated with Matt Berry.  The pair then starred in their own comedy series, Snuff Box, on BBC Three. In addition to his acting and writing, Fulcher is also a singer and dancer, and has employed these talents in various Boosh episodes and stage shows, on Snuff Box, and as tech correspondent and stand up comic Dane Rivers on the comedy videocast Goodnight Burbank. He was interviewed on the first episode of comedian Steve Agee's podcast The John Show. He has also provided the voice-over for an MBNA credit card advert. In 2007, he provided the vocals to the electro song "Uncle Kevin" by DeadDogInBlackBag.

On November 5, 2007 he starred in Golf War on E4, alongside Season 1 Boosh regulars Simon Farnaby and Matt Berry. He currently stars in ITV's mobile TV show The Gym as Dave Darblay, a life coach unable to recover from the loneliness of being left by his wife.

In 2008, he also appeared in an episode of Adult Swim's Fat Guy Stuck in Internet entitled "Beast and Breakfast", as well as playing the character of Mr Brilliance in BBC Three comedy, Trexx and Flipside. He also appeared as the priest at Sarah Silverman's wedding to her dog in a 2008 episode of The Sarah Silverman Program, and reprised the role in the later episode "Nightmayor".

It was announced on November 11, 2008 that MTV had commissioned a spin-off series of The Mighty Boosh, starring Rich Fulcher as Eleanor, the transvestite who appeared in the Mighty Boosh Series Three episode "Eels".

He appeared as a talent show judge in series 3 of the British TV drama Skins, and appeared on the final episode of the US TV series Monk.

In addition, Fulcher had a recurring role in the Comedy Central show Jon Benjamin Has a Van as Edward Sheath, a consumer advocate bringing attention to the terrible things he does in the segment "Shame on Me".

He guest-starred as a jaybird in the episode "Apple Thief" of Adventure Time. The episode aired on October 3, 2011. He also guest-starred in the episode "Exes and Oh-No's!" of the Adult Swim show NTSF:SD:SUV.

He presents the music show InPutOutPut on Channel 4.

Fulcher voiced one of the elves in Arthur Christmas, released on November 23, 2011. On November 25, 2011, he guest-starred in an episode of SpongeBob SquarePants titled "Way of the Sponge", playing Fuzzy Acorns.

On July 16, 2013, he appeared on Comedy Central's Drunk History retelling the story of Abraham Lincoln during his time as a lawyer. He has since returned to the series on several occasions, portraying Porter Wagoner, Julius Waties Waring, William A. Clark, and Franklin Delano Roosevelt.

In 2014–2015, he voiced Queen Entozoa/Sourdough and one of the worms in an episode of a Disney animated show Wander Over Yonder.

He made an appearance on Regular Show in episode 16: "Butt Dial" as the Answering Machine, one of the Phone Guardians. He also made an appearance on Rick and Morty in episode 9: "Something Ricked This Way Comes" as King Flippy-nips, ruler of Pluto.

On March 1, 2015, he guest-starred in an episode of Bob's Burgers titled "The Gayle Tales", playing a character named Stacy. Later in 2015, Fulcher appeared in the BBC Three comedy Top Coppers as Mayor Grady.

He guest-starred on three episodes of Cartoon Network's The Amazing World of Gumball as Frankie Watterson, Richard's estranged conman father: "The Signature" (from season 4), "The Outside" (from season 5), and "The Father" (from season 6).

He currently voices Watson in Animation Domination High-Def's web-series, The Adventures of OG Sherlock Kush.

In 2017, Fulcher appeared in Curb Your Enthusiasm, playing the role of a restaurant manager in season 9, episode 3 – "A Disturbance in the Kitchen".

Fulcher appeared in the 2018 episode "I'm Sick" on the Netflix series Love, playing the character of Glen Michener, an actor who played the role of Michael Myers in Halloween. Later in 2018, Fulcher appeared in the Showtime series Kidding, as Clay, one of the puppeteers alongside Jim Carrey.

Filmography

Film

Television

References

External links
Rich Fulcher official website http://www.richfulcher.com

BBC Website Snuff Box Section
The Mighty Boosh Rich Fulcher interview
Rich Fulcher on Channel 101
"Tiny Acts of Rebellion" official website
Mr. Bingo, "Tiny Acts of Rebellion" illustrator

1968 births
Living people
Male actors from Chicago
American sketch comedians
American expatriates in the United Kingdom
American male television actors
American television writers
American male television writers
Dartmouth College alumni
Comedians from Illinois
St. Albans School (Washington, D.C.) alumni
Screenwriters from Illinois
21st-century American comedians
American male film actors
American male voice actors
21st-century American screenwriters
21st-century American male writers